Chak Tajpur   is a village in Chanditala I community development block of Srirampore subdivision in Hooghly district in the Indian state of West Bengal.

Geography

Gram panchayat
Villages in Shiakhala gram panchayat are: Chak Tajpur, Madhupur, Paschim Tajpur, Patul, Raghunathpur, Sandhipur and Sehakhala.

Demographics
As per 2011 Census of India Chak Tajpur had a total population of 2,692 of which 1,308 (49%) were males and 1,384 (51%) were females. Population below 6 years was 297. The total number of literates in Chak Tajpur was 1,945 (81.21% of the population over 6 years).

References

Villages in Chanditala I CD Block